Fire Walk with Us! is the second studio album by the Italian industrial black metal band Aborym. It is Aborym's first album with the Mayhem vocalist Attila Csihar as a full-time member. Fire Walk with Us! includes a cover version of Burzum's Norwegian language "Det som en gang var", in which bass guitarist Malfeitor Fabban performs vocals.

Track list

Personnel
 Attila Csihar – vocals
 Malfeitor Fabban – bass guitar, keyboard, synthesizer and sampling, backing vocals
 Nysrok – lead guitar, sampling, backing vocals
 Set Teitan – rhythm guitar, sampling

References

2001 albums
Aborym albums
Scarlet Records albums